Dendrophile may refer to: 
 A person who loves trees, as in Dendrophilia (paraphilia)
 Dendrophile (album), a 2011 recording by Justin Vivian Bond